Legio I Adiutrix ( First Legion "Rescuer"), was a legion of the Imperial Roman army founded in AD 68, possibly by Galba when he rebelled against emperor Nero (r. 54–68). The last record mentioning the Adiutrix is in 344, when it was stationed at Brigetio (modern Szőny), in the Roman province of Pannonia. The emblem of the legion was a capricorn, used along with the winged horse Pegasus, on the helmets the symbol used by I Adiutrix legionaries was a dolphin.

Origins
The legion probably was founded by Nero, although some sources provide that it was Galba. Some theories propose the idea that Nero began to recruit marines from the Misenum navy, and Galba likely was responsible for the last stages of the organization, when sacrifices were made, and the legion received its aquila standard. Some children may have been among the first recruits.

Year of the Four Emperors 
In the confusing Year of the Four Emperors, the legion fought in Otho's army in the Battle of Bedriacum, where this emperor was defeated by Vitellius The victorious Vitellius ordered the legion transferred to Spain, but by the year 70 it was fighting in the Batavian rebellion.

Stationed in Moguntiacum
The city of Moguntiacum (Mainz) is the legion's first known base camp, shared with Legio XIV Gemina, where they attended mainly building activities. In 83, they fought the Germanic wars against the Chatti, a German tribe living across the Rhine, under the command of Emperor Domitian. After that they were transferred to the Danubian army stationed in the Roman province of Pannonia, to fight the Dacians.

Legio I Adiutrix Pia Fidelis
Following the murder of Domitian in 96, the Adiutrix, along with the Danubian army, played an important role in Roman politics, forcing Nerva to adopt Trajan as his successor. When Trajan became emperor, he gave the legion the cognomen Pia Fidelis ("loyal and faithful") to acknowledge their support. Between 101 and 106, under the new emperor's command, I Adiutrix, along with IV Flavia Felix and XIII Gemina, conquered Dacia and occupied the newly formed province. Trajan also used his Pia Fidelis in the campaign against Parthia (115–117), but they were sent back to Pannonia by his successor emperor Hadrian, with base in Brigetio.

During the next decades, I Adiutrix remained in the Danube frontier. Under Marcus Aurelius, I Adiutrix fought the war against Marcomanni commanded by Marcus Valerius Maximianus. Between 171 and 175, the commander was Pertinax, emperor for a brief period in 193. When Septimius Severus became emperor, I Adiutrix was among his supporters, following him in the march for Rome.

In the next decades, the main base was again Pannonia, but they played a part in several Parthian wars, namely the campaigns of 195 and 197–198 of Septimius Severus, 215–217 led by Caracalla and 244 by Gordian III.

It (probably vexilationes of it) took part in the battle of Mediolanum.

The legion received the cognomen Pia Fidelis Bis ("twice loyal and faithful") and Constans ("reliable"), sometime in the 3rd century.

Attested members

See also

List of Roman legions

Notes

References

Primary sources
Tacitus, Histories.

Secondary sources
, art. Legio, in NP 7 (1999), klm. 7-22.

01 Adiutrix
68 establishments
Chatti
Marine forces history
Military units and formations established in the 1st century
60s establishments in the Roman Empire
60s establishments
Roman marines